Standings and results for Group D of the UEFA Euro 2008 qualifying tournament.

Germany secured qualification to the tournament proper on 13 October 2007 following a 0–0 draw against the Republic of Ireland, becoming the first team in the whole of the qualification stage to do so. Czech Republic secured qualification to the tournament proper on 17 October 2007 following a 3–0 win against Germany, becoming the third team in the whole of the qualification stage to do so.

Standings

Matches
Group D fixtures were negotiated at a meeting between the participants in Frankfurt, Germany on 9 February 2006.

Goalscorers

References

UEFA website

Group D
2006–07 in Welsh football
2007–08 in Welsh football
2006 in Republic of Ireland association football
2007 in Republic of Ireland association football
2006–07 in German football
qual
2006–07 in Czech football
2007–08 in Czech football
Czech Republic at UEFA Euro 2008
2006–07 in Cypriot football
2007–08 in Cypriot football
2006–07 in Slovak football
2007–08 in Slovak football
2006–07 in San Marino football
2007–08 in San Marino football